Stand Up, Virgin Soldiers is a 1977 British film directed by Norman Cohen and starring Robin Askwith and Nigel Davenport. It is a sequel to The Virgin Soldiers (1969). The screenplay was written by Leslie Thomas based on his 1975 novel of the same name.

Cast
 Robin Askwith as Pte Brigg
 Nigel Davenport as Sgt Driscoll
 George Layton as Pte Jacobs
 John Le Mesurier as Col Bromley-Pickering
 Warren Mitchell as Morris Morris
 Robin Nedwell as Lt Grainger
 Edward Woodward as Sgt Wellbeloved
 Irene Handl as Mrs Phillimore
 Pamela Stephenson as Bernice
 Lynda Bellingham as Valerie
 David Auker as Lantry
 Fiesta Mei Ling as Juicy Lucy
 Miriam Margolyes as Elephant Ethel
 Patrick Newell as M.O. Billings

References

External links
 

1977 films
1977 drama films
British Empire war films
British war films
British war drama films
Films based on British novels
Films directed by Norman Cohen
Films set in Malaysia
Military humor in film
Films about the Malayan Emergency
Films shot at EMI-Elstree Studios
1970s English-language films
1970s British films